New City Church is a multi-site church in Charlotte, North Carolina. The church is a member of the Evangelical Free Church of America denomination. New City has two campuses, one in the SouthPark area of Charlotte and one on Monroe Road in the nearby suburb of Matthews. Weekend services are held on Sunday mornings at both locations. The church's purpose statement is “to be a community of Christ followers bringing gospel renewal to our city and world.”  Weekend services on both campuses average about 3,000 attendees.

History
New City was formed in 2018, through the blending of Church at Charlotte (now the SouthPark campus) and New Charlotte Church (now the Matthews campus). New Charlotte Church was an Evangelical Presbyterian congregation founded in 2010, while Church at Charlotte was an EFCA congregation founded in 1973. The merged church joined the EFCA.

Ministries 
New City's campuses each have a variety of ministry options for adults, students, and children.

References

External links
 

Evangelical churches in Charlotte, North Carolina
Evangelical churches in North Carolina
1973 establishments in North Carolina